Ellen Hodgson Brown (born September 15, 1945) is an American author, attorney, public speaker, and advocate of alternative medicine and financial reform, most prominently public banking. Brown is the founder and president of the Public Banking Institute, a nonpartisan think tank devoted to the creation of publicly run banks.  She has appeared on cable and network television, radio, and internet programs and podcasts. She ran for California Treasurer in the California June 2014 Statewide Primary election.

Life and career
She attended law school at the University of California, Los Angeles, where she was Book Review Editor of the UCLA Law Review and obtained her J.D. in 1977. Her law review article, "Restrictions on Alternative Medical Practitioners in California: A Legal and Economic Analysis," published in the UCLA Law Review in 1977, was cited in the dissenting opinion in People v. Privitera, 23 Cal.3d 697 (Cal. 1979) by California Supreme Court Chief Justice Rose Bird, who called it "an excellent and exhaustive review of case and statutory law" on alternative medicine.

Brown was a civil litigation attorney in Los Angeles for ten years.

In 2011, Brown founded the Public Banking Institute (PBI) to promote research and advocacy of public banks. In 2013, Brown published The Public Bank Solution, revisiting her arguments in Web of Debt, tracing the history of public banking, and discussing various options to implement it in the contemporary economy.

In October, 2013, her opinion piece on public banking, "Public Banks are Key to Capitalism", appeared in The New York Times.

In 2013, Brown announced her candidacy for California State Treasurer on the Green Party ticket in the 2014 election. On December 27, 2013, the Green Party of California endorsed Brown's candidacy. Brown received 6.5% of the vote during the June primaries, putting her in third place among three candidates, and thus not qualifying her for the general election due to California's "top two" primary system.

Books

 1990:
1990:
1994:
1998:
1998:
1998:
2001:
2002:
 2003:
 2007:
 2013:

References

External links

1945 births
Living people
American economics writers
American essayists
American lawyers
American women lawyers
California Greens
Women in California politics
People from Pleasanton, California
American women essayists
Activists from California
Alternative medicine activists
Alternative cancer treatment advocates
21st-century American women